Chlorophyll(ide) b reductase, chlorophyll b reductase, Chl b reductase) is an enzyme with systematic name 71-hydroxychlorophyllide-a:NAD(P)+ oxidoreductase. This enzyme catalyses the following chemical reaction

 71-hydroxychlorophyllide a + NAD(P)+  chlorophyllide b + NAD(P)H + H+

This enzyme carries out the first step in the conversion of chlorophyll b to chlorophyll a. It is involved in chlorophyll degradation, which occurs during leaf senescence, and it also forms part of the chlorophyll cycle, which interconverts chlorophyll a and b in response to changing light conditions.

References

External links 
 

EC 1.1.1